The 1980 Southeast Missouri State Indians football team represented Southeast Missouri State University as a member of the Missouri Intercollegiate Athletic Association (MIAA) during the 1980 NCAA Division II football season. Led by sixth-year head coach Jim Lohr, the Indians compiled an overall record of 4–7 with a mark of 3–3 in conference play, placing in a three way tie for third in the MIAA. Southeast Missouri State played home game at Houck Stadium in Cape Girardeau, Missouri.

Schedule

Roster

References 

Southeast Missouri State
Southeast Missouri State Redhawks football seasons
Southeast Missouri State Indians football